Lover Man is an album led by pianist Duke Jordan recorded in 1975 but not released on the Danish SteepleChase label until 1979.

Reception

AllMusic awarded the album 3 stars.

Track listing
All compositions by Duke Jordan except as indicated
 "Dig" (Miles Davis) - 4:22
 "Dancer's Call" - 6:11
 "Love Train" - 8:51
 "Don't Blame Me" (Dorothy Fields, Jimmy McHugh) - 5:57 Bonus track on CD release
 "Sea" (Al Foster) - 4:08 Bonus track on CD release
 "Lover Man" (Jimmy Davis, Ram Ramirez, Jimmy Sherman) - 6:59
 "They Say It's Wonderful" (Irving Berlin) - 6:19
 "Out of Nowhere" (Johnny Green, Edward Heyman) - 6:13

Personnel
Duke Jordan - piano
Sam Jones - bass 
Al Foster - drums

References

1979 albums
Duke Jordan albums
SteepleChase Records albums